The Fontenelle Bank is a historic building in Bellevue, Nebraska. It was built with bricks in 1856, and the facade was designed in the Greek Revival style, with pilasters, and the Italianate style, with "the elaborate window caps and the elongation of the wall openings." It housed the Fontenelle Bank in 1856–1857, and it was the first Sarpy County Courthouse from 1861 to 1875, followed by Bellevue's town hall until 1959. It has been listed on the National Register of Historic Places since April 16, 1969.

See also
Third Sarpy County Courthouse, also NRHP-listed
List of the oldest buildings in Nebraska

References

	
National Register of Historic Places in Sarpy County, Nebraska
Greek Revival architecture in Nebraska
Italianate architecture in Nebraska
Commercial buildings completed in 1856
1856 establishments in Nebraska Territory